The Shadow ministry of Peter Malinauskas was the Labor Party opposition from April 2018 to March 2022, opposing the Marshall government of the Liberal Party in the Parliament of South Australia. It was led by Peter Malinauskas following his election as party leader and leader of the opposition on 9 April 2018 until the 2022 state election. The deputy leader of the shadow ministry during this period was Susan Close.

The shadow ministry transitioned to the Malinauskas ministry following Labor's victory at the 2022 state election.

Shadow cabinet 
The below was the latest Malinauskas shadow ministry, announced on 8 April 2021, prior to the 2022 state election.

See also
2022 South Australian state election 
Marshall ministry
Malinauskas ministry

References

South Australia-related lists